A currant bun is a European sweet bun that contains currants or raisins.

The Chelsea bun is a variant. Neither should be confused with a spiced bun, nor with a similar cake called the tea cake. Nor should it be confused with the scone, a form of cake that is also likely to use currants but which is generally smaller, and which is usually eaten with butter or some butter substitute.

Currant Bun is English rhyming slang for the tabloid newspaper The Sun.

History
Towards the end of the seventeenth century the Reverend Samuel Wigley founded the Currant Bun Company in Southampton, Hampshire, UK. He imported currants from the island of Zakynthos where he had served as a missionary in his youth. Despite having failed to convert the population to Puritanism he did bring back the prize of the currant which he combined with traditional Hampshire bakery expertise to create the currant bun.

In 1824 Duncan Higgins adapted the recipe and used the now freely available Zakynthos currants to create the classic Chelsea bun in his bakery on Fulham Road, adjacent to the fashionable Chelsea district of London.

Every year in February the descendants of Mr Higgins hold a Chelsea Bun festival in which they celebrate their forefather's culinary achievements.

See also
 List of buns

References

Sweet breads
Buns